Cryphula is a genus of dirt-colored seed bugs in the family Rhyparochromidae. There are about 14 described species in Cryphula.

Species
These 14 species belong to the genus Cryphula:

 Cryphula abortiva Barber, 1918
 Cryphula affinis (Distant, 1901)
 Cryphula apicata (Distant, 1893)
 Cryphula australis (Berg, 1884)
 Cryphula bennetti Baranowski & Slater, 1979
 Cryphula brunnea Dellapé, Melo & O’Donnell, 2015
 Cryphula dubia (Berg, 1883)
 Cryphula fasciata (Distant, 1893)
 Cryphula humeralis Dellapé, Melo & O’Donnell, 2015
 Cryphula nitens Barber, 1955
 Cryphula parallelogramma Stal, 1874
 Cryphula rivierei Dellapé, Melo & O’Donnell, 2015
 Cryphula subunicolor Barber, 1955
 Cryphula trimaculata (Distant, 1893)

References

Rhyparochromidae
Articles created by Qbugbot
Pentatomomorpha genera